John Blackwood FRSE (1818–1879) was a Scottish publisher, sixth son of William Blackwood.  John succeeded his father as editor of the business in 1834, on William's death. Four years later he was joined by Major William Blackwood, who continued in the firm until his death in 1861. Five of William Blackwood's seven sons played a role in the running of the company, William Blackwood and Sons.

Life

He was born at 2 Salisbury Road in south Edinburgh on 7 December 1818.

Educated at the High School and University of Edinburgh, he early displayed literary tastes, which procured for him the nickname of "the little editor."

At the close of his college career he spent three years in continental travel. 
Soon after his return, his father having meanwhile died and been succeeded by two of his elder brothers, he entered, in 1839, to learn business, the house of a then eminent London publishing firm.

In 1840, he was entrusted with the superintendence of the branch which his brother's Edinburgh house was establishing in London. 
He occupied this position for six years, during which his office in Pall Mall became a literary rendezvous, among his visitors being Lockhart of the Quarterly Review, Delane of The Times, and Thackeray, with the last two of whom he formed an intimate friendship.

One of his functions was to procure recruits for Blackwood's Magazine, then edited by his eldest brother, and to him was due the connection formed with it by the first Lord Lytton, who began in 1842 to contribute to it his translation of the poems and ballads of Schiller. 
In 1845, he returned to Edinburgh on the death of his eldest brother, whom he succeeded in the editorship of Blackwood's Magazine. 
In 1852, by the death of another elder brother, he became virtual head of the publishing business also, and he retained both positions until his death. As an editor he was critical and suggestive, as well as appreciative. 
As a publisher he preferred quality to the production of quantity; in both capacities he displayed hereditary acumen and liberality.

He quickly discerned the genius of George Eliot, forthwith accepting and publishing in his magazine the first instalment of her earliest fiction the 'Scenes of Clerical Life,' which had been sent to him without the name of the author, for whom thus early he predicted a great career as a novelist. 
This commencement of a business connection was soon followed by a personal acquaintance between author and publisher, which ripened into intimacy. 
In her husband's biography of George Eliot there are many indications of her readiness to accept Blackwood's friendly criticisms and suggestions, and of her grateful regard for him. 
On hearing of the probably fatal termination of his last illness she wrote: 

All her books, after the "Scenes of Clerical Life," were, with one exception, first published by his firm. 
Although Blackwood was a staunch conservative and the conductor of the chief monthly organ of conservatism, he always welcomed, whether as editor or publisher, what he considered to be literary ability, without regard to the political or religious opinions of its possessors. 
A genial and convivial host and companion, he delighted to dispense, at his house in Edinburgh, and his country house, Strathtyrum, near St. Andrews, a liberal hospitality to authors with whom he had formed a business connection. 
To his magazine he contributed directly only occasional obituary notices of prominent contributors.

In later life his Edinburgh address was 3 Randolph Crescent on the southern edge of the Moray Estate.

He died at Strathtyrum House near St Andrews on 29 October 1879. He is buried on a small west-facing section of wall on the southern edge of Dean Cemetery in Edinburgh. A secondary memorial to John is within his father's family vault in Old Calton Burial Ground.

The Blackwood family still live to this day in Ayrshire, Scotland around the Doon Valley Area and other parts of Ayrshire.

References

Attribution:

Further reading
Porter, Mary Blackwood (Mrs. Gerald Porter), Annals of a Publishing House: John Blackwood, by his Daughter Mrs. Gerald Porter. Edinburgh and London, William Blackwood and Sons, 1898.

External links
More on John Blackwood and George Eliot (including letters, articles, and book editions) at the George Eliot Archive

1818 births
1879 deaths
Blackwood family (publishers)
Scottish magazine publishers (people)
Fellows of the Royal Society of Edinburgh
Publishers (people) from Edinburgh
People educated at the Royal High School, Edinburgh
Alumni of the University of Edinburgh
Scottish magazine editors
19th-century Scottish businesspeople
19th-century British journalists
British male journalists
19th-century British male writers
19th-century British writers